Xenotransplantation is a bimonthly peer-reviewed medical journal covering xenotransplantation. It is published by Wiley-Blackwell and the editor-in-chief is Leo H. Bühler (University of Fribourg). The annual Carl-Gustav Groth Xeno Prize of US$7,000 is presented to the first author of the best article published in the journal.

The journal exhibited unusual levels of self-citation and its journal impact factor of 2019 was suspended from Journal Citation Reports in 2020, a sanction which hit 34 journals in total.

References

External links

Organ transplantation journals
Wiley-Blackwell academic journals
Xenotransplantation
Bimonthly journals
English-language journals
Publications established in 1998